Sayeed Atiqullah (1933-1998) was a Bangladeshi writer, poet, and journalist.

Early life
Atiqullah was borb in 1933 in Tangail District, East Bengal, British Raj. He completed a master's degree in Political Science from the University of Dhaka.

Career
Atiqullah worked as a journalist after graduation. He was involved with the Bengali language movement in 1952. In 1971, he fought in the Bangladesh Liberation war. He wrote a number of notable short stories. In 1974 he was awarded the Bangla Academy Literary Award by the Bangla Academy for his writings. He translated books from English, Russian, and Urdu to Bengali. In the 1980s he was involved with protests against the General Hussain Mohammad Ershad, the military dictator of Bangladesh.

Death
Atiqullah died in 1998.

References

1933 births
1998 deaths
University of Dhaka alumni
Mukti Bahini personnel
People from Tangail District
Recipients of Bangla Academy Award
20th-century Bangladeshi poets
Bangladeshi journalists
20th-century journalists